Gonzalo Martín Klusener (born 21 October 1983) is an Argentine footballer currently playing for Club Atlético Atlanta.

References

Profile at EPAE.org

1983 births
Living people
Argentine footballers
Argentine expatriate footballers
Argentine Primera División players
Primera Nacional players
Estudiantes de La Plata footballers
Defensa y Justicia footballers
Club Almagro players
Talleres de Córdoba footballers
Thrasyvoulos F.C. players
Guillermo Brown footballers
Olimpo footballers
C.D. Antofagasta footballers
Unión de Mar del Plata footballers
Quilmes Atlético Club footballers
Atlético de Rafaela footballers
Club Agropecuario Argentino players
Independiente Rivadavia footballers
F.C. Motagua players
Expatriate footballers in Chile
Expatriate footballers in Greece
Argentine expatriate sportspeople in Greece
Argentine expatriate sportspeople in Chile
Argentine expatriate sportspeople in Honduras
Association football forwards
Liga Nacional de Fútbol Profesional de Honduras players
People from Oberá
Sportspeople from Misiones Province